Fushiga is a genre of ukiyo-e woodblock prints depicting satirical pictures accompaniyed with text. Fushiga prints usually depicted ordinary people in their everyday activities, with their exclamations written next to them, and not celebrities or famous landscapes. Fushiga relied more on text than on the image, and because of that was "virtually ignored by Western critics of the print".

History
The genre emerged as an attempt at criticism of the government and social situations of the late Tokugawa regime in the 1860s, many prints were very political and were not signed. "An ordinary-looking picture of Edoites flying kites could thus be transformed into a sharp commentary on inflation, with the kites bearing the names of basic commodities, and the text complaining about how things are going up and up." 

Kyu Hyun Kim writes that some prints, for example Utagawa Kuniyoshi's Prince Minamoto Yorimitsu Encounters the Earth Spider Demon (1843), were "purported to depict mythical heroes from kabuki plays, who were in fact identifiable to contemporaries as satirical representations of real-life shogunate officials and domain lords". Another example is The great battle between the fruit and vegetable army and the fish troops, 1859 by Utagawa Hirokage, that appears to be:

There were attempts by the shogunate to limit and control such prints, but they were not very successful. Government sanctioned and punished for the production of such prints. For example Utagawa Kuniyoshi was arrested and interrogated for his print Kitai na meii nanbyō chiryō (The Rare and Brilliant Doctor Treats Tough Diseases, 1850), "features a female doctor named Kogarashi treating a motley crew of patients with comically exaggerated illnesses. One of them is a nearsighted old man, who represents Abe Masahiro, grumbling, 'I can see the tip of my nose, but nothing far away.'" Producers were fined, the prints confiscated and destroyed.

Gallery

References

Ukiyo-e genres